Meaux Abbey (archaic, also referred to as Melsa) was a Cistercian abbey founded in 1151 by William le Gros, 1st Earl of Albemarle (Count of Aumale), Earl of York and 4th Lord of Holderness, near Beverley in the East Riding of Yorkshire, England.

A chronicle of its history was written by Thomas Burton, one of the abbots. The abbey owned the land of Wyke, which was purchased from it by King Edward I of England in 1293 to establish the town of Kingston upon Hull.

The abbey was closed in 1539 by King Henry VIII. It was demolished, and the stones were used to build defences for the town of Kingston upon Hull.

The site of the abbey is a Scheduled Ancient Monument.

References

Sources

External links 

Monasteries in the East Riding of Yorkshire
Cistercian monasteries in England
1151 establishments in England
Religious organizations established in the 1150s
Christian monasteries established in the 12th century
1539 disestablishments in England
Scheduled monuments in the East Riding of Yorkshire
Demolished buildings and structures in England